This is the complete list of works by military science fiction and space opera author David Weber.

Bibliography
The first-edition hardcover releases by Baen Books of War of Honor, Wind Rider's Oath, At All Costs, Hell Hath No Fury, Torch of Freedom, and Mission of Honor each contain a CD, holding electronic copies of all the David Weber books published by Baen up to that moment. The CD labels explicitly state that the contents are freely distributable. The CDs have been mirrored on various sites.

Many of Weber's books are available online, either in their entirety as part of the Baen Free Library or, in the case of more recent books, in the form of sample chapters (typically the first 25–33% of the work).

Honorverse 
Works within the Honorverse fictional universe, derived from the Honor Harrington series

Honor Harrington series 
This series follows Honor Harrington, a young officer in the Royal Manticoran Navy as she works her way up through the ranks. Throughout the series she encounters the many set-backs and road blocks that any underdog may face but with her extraordinary wits and determination she never lets anything get in her way of serving her Queen and Star Nation to the fullest.
 On Basilisk Station (April 1993) 
 The Honor of the Queen (June 1993) 
 The Short Victorious War (April 1994) 
 Field of Dishonor (October 1994) 
 Flag in Exile (September 1995) 
 Honor Among Enemies (February 1996) 
 In Enemy Hands (July 1997) 
 Echoes of Honor (October 1998) 
 Ashes of Victory (March 2000) 
 War of Honor (October 2002) 
 At All Costs (November 2005) 
 Mission of Honor (June 2010) 
 A Rising Thunder (March 6, 2012) 
 Uncompromising Honor (October 2, 2018)

Works related to the Honor Harrington series 
 Worlds of Honor anthologies Novellas and short stories related to the Honor Harrington series. Edited by Weber.

 More Than Honor (January 1998) 
 Worlds of Honor (February 1999) 
 Changer of Worlds (March 2001) 
 The Service of the Sword (April 2003) 
 In Fire Forged (February 2011) 
 Beginnings (July 2, 2013) 
 What Price Victory? (February 7, 2023) 

 Crown of Slaves sub-series

 Crown of Slaves with Eric Flint (September 2003) 
 Torch of Freedom with Eric Flint (November 2009)  
 Cauldron of Ghosts with Eric Flint (April 8, 2014) 
 To End in Fire with Eric Flint (October 5, 2021) 

 Saganami sub-series

 The Shadow of Saganami (October 2004) 
 Storm from the Shadows (March 2009) 
 Shadow of Freedom (March 5, 2013)  
 Shadow of Victory (November 1, 2016) 

 Young adult series

Focuses on Stephanie Harrington and the discovery of treecats.
 A Beautiful Friendship (October 2011) 
 Fire Season with Jane Lindskold (October 2012) 
 Treecat Wars with Jane Lindskold (October 1, 2013) 
 A New Clan with Jane Lindskold (June 2022) 

 Companion

 House of Steel: The Honorverse Companion (May 2013) —Includes the new novella I Will Build a House of Steel by David Weber.

 The Manticore Ascendant series

It includes a short story published in Beginnings, "A Call to Arms", and is intended to include at least three novels.

 A Call to Duty with Timothy Zahn (October 7, 2014) 
 A Call to Arms with Timothy Zahn and Thomas Pope (October 6, 2015) 
 A Call to Vengeance with Timothy Zahn and Thomas Pope (March 6, 2018), 
 A Call to Insurrection with Timothy Zahn and Thomas Pope (February 1, 2022), 

Short stories (not included in other Honorverse collections)

 "Our Sacred Honor" Published in Infinite Stars (October 2017) : Anthology edited Bryan Thomas Schmidt
 "Recruiting Exercise" Published in Noir Fatale (May 2019) : Anthology edited by Larry Correia and Kacey Ezell
 "Heart of Stone" Published in Give Me Libertycon (June 2020) : Anthology edited by Christopher Woods and T. K. F. Weisskopf
 "A Travesty of Nature" Published in Onward Libertycon June 2022 : Anthology edited by Christopher Woods and T. K. F. Weisskopf

Dahak series 
 Mutineers' Moon (October 1991) 
 The Armageddon Inheritance (October 1994) 
 Heirs of Empire (February 1996) 
 An omnibus re-issue of all three books, titled Empire from the Ashes, was released in hardcover in March 2003 and in trade paperback in February 2006.

War God series 
 Oath of Swords (February 1995) 
 The War God's Own (May 1998) 
 Wind Rider's Oath (May 2004) 
 Sword Brother, a novella published in the January 2007 edition of Oath of Swords, 
 War Maid's Choice (July 2012)  (HB)
 The Sword of the South (August 4, 2015)

Safehold series 
The Safehold series
 Off Armageddon Reef (January 2007) 
 By Schism Rent Asunder (July 2008) 
 By Heresies Distressed (June 2009) 
 A Mighty Fortress (April 2010) 
 How Firm a Foundation (September 2011) 
 Midst Toil and Tribulation (September 2012) 
 Like a Mighty Army (February 18, 2014) 
 Hell's Foundations Quiver (October 13, 2015)  
 At the Sign of Triumph (November 8, 2016) 
 Through Fiery Trials (January 8, 2019)

Furies series 
 Path of the Fury (December 1992) . This is a story of Alicia DeVries, a retired female marine commando, the fading Fury Tisiphone, and an AI running an advanced warship centuries in the future, who team up to hunt down space pirates.
 In Fury Born (April 2006)  is an expanded re-issue of Path of the Fury that includes a prequel story about the protagonist.
 Governor (June 2021) . Coauthored with Richard Fox, this story is set during the League Wars and tells of the beginning of the rise of the house of Murphy.

Shongairi series 
 Out of the Dark (September 2010) is an extended version of the 78-page story of the same name in the anthology Warriors (2010), edited by George R. R. Martin and Gardner Dozois. .
 Into the Light (January 2021), coauthored with Chris Kennedy, is a sequel to Out of the Dark.

Other novels 
 The Apocalypse Troll (January 1999). This is the story of a retired naval officer who witnesses an intense air battle from his yacht and rescues the downed pilot who turns out to be from the future. She was shot down by an interstellar enemy that she chased through time and space on their way to "Terra" to eliminate humans before they can win the war they are fighting in the future. 
 The Excalibur Alternative (January 2002), expands "Sir George and the Dragon", a short story which appeared in the anthology Foreign Legions edited by David Drake (2001).

Short stories 
 "The Captain from Kirkbean", collected by Harry Turtledove's in the anthology Alternate Generals (1998)
 "Out of the Dark" collected by Gardner Dozois and George R. R. Martin in the anthology Warriors (2010)
 "Washington's Rebellion" collected by Joan Spicci Saberhagen and Robert E. Vardeman in the anthology Golden Reflections" (2011)
 "Dark Fall" Published on the Baen Website (2018)
 "Marching Through", collected by Chris Kennedy and James Young in the anthology Trouble in the Wind (2019)
 "Home Is Where the Heart Is", collected by Edward Willett in the anthology Shapers of Worlds (2020)
 "Fire from Heaven" Collected by Robert E. Hampson and Sandra L. Medlockand in the anthology The Founder Effect (2020)
 "Kamekura", Collected in Robert E. Hampson and Sandra L. Medlockand in the anthology The Founder Effect (2020)

 Collections 
 Worlds of Weber: Ms. Midshipwoman Harrington and Other Stories (September 2008) 

 Shared universes Bolo series
Works set in the Bolo fictional universe created by Keith Laumer
 Bolo! (January 2005) . Stories of Bolo tanks with artificial intelligence.
 Old Soldiers (January 2007) , a Bolo tank story

 Collaborations 
 With Steve White Starfire series (based on the Starfire games).
 Insurrection (November 1990)  (chronologically this novel takes place after The Shiva Option)
 Crusade (March 1992) 
 In Death Ground (May 1997) 
 The Shiva Option (February 2002) 
 Omnibus collections:
 The Stars at War (August 2004)  is an omnibus hardcover re-issue of Crusade and In Death Ground The Stars at War II (July 2005)  is an omnibus hardcover re-issue of The Shiva Option and Insurrection with 20,000 words of connecting material and restored edits.

 With John Ringo Empire of Man series.
 March Upcountry (May 2001) 
 March to the Sea (2001) 
 March to the Stars (January 2003) 
 We Few (April 2005) 
 Omnibus collections:
 Empire of Man (February 2014) ; collects March Upcountry and March to the Sea Throne of Stars (August 2014); collects March to the Stars and We Few With Eric Flint 1632 series.
 1633 (July 2002) 
 1634: The Baltic War (May 2007) 
 "In the Navy", a short story in the anthology Ring of Fire edited by Eric Flint (2004) , set in the world of the 1632 series

 With Jacob Holo Gordian Division series.
 The Gordian Protocol (May 2019) 
 The Valkyrie Protocol (October 2020) 
 The Janus File (October 2022) 

 Multiverse series
 With Linda Evans: 
 Hell's Gate (October 2006) 
 Hell Hath No Fury (March 2007) 
 With Joelle Presby:
 The Road to Hell (March 1, 2016)The Road to Hell (3) (Multiverse Series)1476780676
 untitled fourth volume (planned)

 Multi-author collections
 The Warmasters (2002) , includes David Weber's Ms. Midshipwoman Harrington together with Island by Eric Flint and Choosing Sides'' by David Drake.

References

 
Bibliographies by writer
Bibliographies of American writers
Science fiction bibliographies
Fantasy bibliographies